Hyposada postvittata is a moth of the family Noctuidae first described by Frederic Moore in 1887. It is found in Sri Lanka and Australia.

Adult wingspan is about 2 cm. Forewings brownish with a black outlined white spot on cell. Each forewing has a white line along the costa. Hindwings each have a black and white transverse line. There is a black mark at the wingtip.

References

Moths of Asia
Moths described in 1887
Acontiinae